Xylographus nitidissimus is a species of beetles of the family Ciidae. It occurs in São Tomé and Príncipe. The species was first described in 1916.

References

Ciidae
Beetles of Africa
Beetles described in 1916
Insects of São Tomé and Príncipe
Fauna of São Tomé Island